Jupiter is the second studio album by the Portland-based indie rock band Starfucker. It was originally released as a mini-LP on May 5, 2009, through Badman Recording Co., and was re-released on January 10, 2012, as a full album with three new tracks as well as updated artwork and mixes of the previously-existing tracks.

Track listing

Note: “Cemetery,” “Queen Latifah” and “Jamie” were not included on the original 2009 release, but were added for the 2012 re-release.

References

2009 albums
2012 albums
STRFKR albums